Jean-Vincent Verdonnet (19 April 1923, Bossey Haute-Savoie – 16 September 2013, Vétraz-Monthoux) was a French poet, close to the . 

He received numerous literary prizes including 
1985: the prix Guillaume Apollinaire
1995: the Prix Paul Verlaine of the Académie française
the Prix des Gens de lettres
the Grand Prix du Mont-Saint-Michel

Works
1951: Attente du jour, Les Cahiers du Nouvel Humanisme
1952: Noël avec les morts réconciliés, Cahiers de Rochefort
1966: Album d'avril, Hautebise
1967: Le Temps de vivre, Club du poème
1971: Lanterne sourde, Formes et Langages, Prix Archon-Despérouses of the Académie française
1972: Cairn, Formes et Langages
1974: L'Écorce écrit son testament, Formes et Langages
1974: S'il neige dans ta voix, Saint-Germain-des-Prés
1976: Arc-en-ciel, Henry Fagne (Belgium)
1976: D'Ailleurs, Saint-Germain-des-Prés
1977: Pénombre mûre, Rougerie
1979: La Faille où la mémoire hiverne, Saint-Germain-des-Prés
1979: Pour tout viatique, Verticales 12
1980: Au temps profils furtifs, Rougerie
1981: Espère et tremble, Rougerie
1984: Ce qui demeure, Rougerie
1984: La Quête inachevée, pour une approche de Gustave Roud, Éditions des Voirons
1984: Poèmes-missives, Guilde du Poème
1987: Fugitif éclat de l'être, Rougerie
1990: Dans l'intervalle, L'Arbre à paroles
1992: À chaque pas prenant congé, Rougerie
1994: Où s'anime une trace (tome I), Rougerie
1995: Copeaux, éditions 
1995: À l'espère tu me rejoins, Rougerie
1996: Où s'anime une trace (tome II), Rougerie
1997: Où s'anime une trace (tome III), Rougerie
1999: Où s'anime une trace (tome IV), Rougerie
2001: D'un temps soucieux d'éternité, drawings by Yves Mairot, Voix d'encre
2002: Ce battement de la parole, Rougerie
2003: Droit d'asile, calligraphies by Henri Renoux, Voix d'encre
2005: Ombre aux doigts de sourcier, illustrations by Claire Nicole, Voix d'encre
2006: Jours déchaux, Rougerie
2008: Mots en maraude, illustrations by Marie-Claire Enevoldsen-Bussat, Voix d'encre
2009: Jean-Vincent Verdonnet, l'art de vivre en poésie. Lecture by Marie-Claire Enevoldsen-Bussat followed by unpublished poems by Jean-Vincent Verdonnet, Éditions Le Tour

References

External links 
 Jean-Vincent VERDONNET on Les Hommes sans épaules
 La furtive écoute de Jean-Vincent Verdonnet
 Le poète Jean-Vincent Verdonnet nous a quittés dans sa 90e année on Le Messager.fr
 Ecole de Rochefort - Verdonnet, Jean-Vincent Université d'Angers
 Jean-Vincent Verdonnet passe le seuil on La Voix des Allobroges
 Jean-Vincent Verdonnet on the site of the Académie française

20th-century French poets
Prix Guillaume Apollinaire winners
People from Haute-Savoie
1923 births
2013 deaths
Commandeurs of the Ordre des Arts et des Lettres